Shut Up Sona is a 2019 documentary film which is made on Bollywood playback singer Sona Mohapatra's life. The movie reflects Mohapatra's unrelenting fight for an equal space in modern day India. It was directed by Deepti Gupta in her directorial debut. Shut Up Sona won National Film Award for best editing.

References

2019 films
2019 documentary films
Indian documentary films